Corralena is a townland in County Westmeath, Ireland. The townland is in the civil parish of St. Mary's.

The townland stands to the southeast of Athlone, to the east of the River Shannon, which forms the border with County Roscommon

References 

Townlands of County Westmeath